Heteroscorpion is a genus of scorpions belonging to the monotypic family Heteroscorpionidae.

The species of this genus are found in Madagascar.

Species:

Heteroscorpion goodmani 
Heteroscorpion kaii 
Heteroscorpion kraepelini 
Heteroscorpion magnus 
Heteroscorpion opisthacanthoides 
Heteroscorpion raselimananai

References

Scorpions